Rebutia mentosa, the crown cactus, is a species of cactus in the genus Rebutia, native to Bolivia. It has gained the Royal Horticultural Society's Award of Garden Merit.

Subspecies
The following subspecies is currently accepted:
Rebutia mentosa subsp. purpurea (Donald & A.B.Lau) Donald ex D.R.Hunt

References

mentosa
Endemic flora of Bolivia
Plants described in 1987